

Results
Arsenal's score comes first

https://www.11v11.com/teams/arsenal/tab/matches/season/1941/

Legend

Football League South

Selected results from the league.

Final League table

London War Cup

Football League War Cup

References

External links
 Arsenal season-by-season line-ups

1940-41
English football clubs 1940–41 season